Vervekovka is a rural locality (a selo) in Popovskoye Rural Settlement, Bogucharsky District, Voronezh Oblast, Russia. The population was 499 as of 2010. There are 2 streets.

Geography
Vervekovka is located 13 km west of Boguchar (the district's administrative centre) by road. Lofitskoye is the nearest rural locality.

References 

Rural localities in Bogucharsky District